The 2011 Chinese Artistic Gymnastics Championships were held from 8 May to 12 May 2011 in Kunshan, Zhejiang.

Men's Event Medal Winners

Women's Event Medal Winners

References

Chinese Artistic Gymnastics Championships
2011 in Chinese sport
Chinese Artistic Gymnastics Championships